Maximilian Kuschel (1851–1909, Breslau) was a German ornithologist and oologist.

Kuschel was sometime a police official (Polizeirat a. D. Polizei-Praesidium) in  Guhrau and Breslau. He was a Member of  Deutsche Ornithologen-Gesellschaft. An accepted authority on eggs Kuschel owned a large collection now in the State Museum of Zoology, Dresden. He was a Tring correspondent.

Works
Kuschel, M., 1895 Zur Oologie Javas. Ornithologische Monatsberichte, III 153–156.
Kuschel, M., 1895 Abrifs einer Beschreibung von Vogeleiern der äthiopischen Ornis. Kuschel, M. Journal für Ornithologie vol. 43 p. 80 - 98 and 321 - 354
Kuschel, M., 1897 Ûber die Fortpflanzung von Cassidix oryzivora Scl. Journal für Ornithologie. 45: 168-170

References
Glegg, W. E., 1951: On seven eggs attributed to the Labrador Duck Camptorhynchus labradorius. Ibis, 93: 305 pdf

German ornithologists
1851 births
1909 deaths